The Plenița gas field is a shale gas field located in Plenița, Dolj County. It was discovered in 2012 and developed by and Sterling Resources. It will begin production in 2015 and will produce shale gas and condensates. The total proven reserves of the Plenița gas field are around 124 billion cubic feet (3.5 km³), and production is slated to be around 11 million cubic feet/day (0.3×105m³) in 2015.

References

Natural gas fields in Romania